Andrew Victor McLaglen (July 28, 1920 – August 30, 2014) was a British-born American film and television director, known for
Westerns and adventure films, often starring John Wayne or James Stewart.

According to one obituary "His career in many ways mirrored that of Ted Post, another inexhaustible director of series television and undemanding movies: reliable rather than stylish, both were nimble soldiers of fortune renowned for bringing work in on time and on budget... Like the best journeymen, he took us on some heroic, enjoyable excursions.  "

Early life and career

McLaglen was born in London, the son of British-American actor Victor McLaglen and his wife, Enid Lamont, who moved to Hollywood in the early 1920s, shortly after his birth. He was from a film family that included eight uncles and an aunt, and he grew up on movie sets with his parents as well as John Wayne and John Ford.  He attended Black Fox Military and The Carl Curtis School then the Cates School in Santa Barbara and the University of Virginia.

During World War Two McLaglen was ruled 4F due to his height and went to work at Lockheed for four years.

Assistant director
When the war ended he wrote to Republic Pictures asking for a job and was made an assistant on Love, Honor and Goodbye (1945). He worked for two years as a general clerk at Republic on movies such as Dakota (1945) then became a second assistant director.

He was an assistant on two Budd Boetticher films, Killer Shark (1950) and Bullfighter and the Lady (1951); on the latter he was promoted to first assistant director. He was 2nd AD on John Ford's The Quiet Man (1952) with his father, and 1st AD on Wild Stallion (1952), Here Come the Marines (1952), Big Jim McLain (1952) with John Wayne, Hellgate (1952), Kansas Pacific (1953), and Fort Vengeance (1953).

He was assistant director on a series of films for John Wayne's company Batjac: Plunder of the Sun (1953), Island in the Sky (1954), The High and the Mighty (1954),  Track of the Cat (1954) and Blood Alley (1954).

Director

Debut features
After several more assistant director jobs, McLaglen directed his first film, Man in the Vault (1956), written by Burt Kennedy.

It was followed by Gun the Man Down (1956), a western B movie with James Arness, whom McLaglen got to know making Big Jim McLain; it also starred Angie Dickinson and Harry Carey Jr. He was going to direct Seven Men from Now (1956) but the job went to Boetticher; McLaglen was credited as a producer. McLaglen had impressed James Arness who arranged for the director to start helming episodes of Gunsmoke. McLaglen directed The Abductors (1957) starring his father Victor.

Television and low budget features
In the late 1950s and early 1960s McLaglen focused on television directing, prolifically directing episodes of The Lineup, Hotel de Paree, Perry Mason (7), Gunslinger (5), Everglades!, Rawhide (6), 116 episodes of Have Gun – Will Travel with Richard Boone,  The Lieutenant (4), The Virginian (2), The Travels of Jaimie McPheeters, Wagon Train, and  96 episodes of Gunsmoke. He directed his father in episodes of Rawhide and Have Gun will Travel.

During this time he directed two low budget children's films for Robert Lippert released through 20th Century Fox, Freckles (1960) and The Little Shepherd of Kingdom Come (1960). In 1960 McLaglen said he was earning between $57,000 and $59,000 a year.

Focus on feature films
His first big budget feature film as director was McLintock! (1963) starring John Wayne and Maureen O'Hara. McLaglen later said " that put me in the big time." The movie, his first of five starring Wayne, was a big success and led to McLaglen being offered another studio feature, Shenandoah (1965), starring James Stewart. It was another success. McLaglen followed it with The Rare Breed (1966), again with Stewart. That year he said that now he was "supposed to be an outdoor specialist. I'm not knocking it if that's the course fate has allowed I'm to follow but personally I don't feel relegated to that kind of picture.

He directed Monkeys, Go Home! (1967), a Disney movie; The Way West (1967) an epic Western with Kirk Douglas; The Ballad of Josie (1967), a comic Western with Doris Day, made at Universal; the war story The Devil's Brigade (1968) with William Holden, for producer David Wolper; and the western Bandolero! starring Stewart, Raquel Welch, and Dean Martin at Fox.

McLaglen then made three films in a row with John Wayne: Hellfighters (1969), a biopic of Red Adair, for Universal; The Undefeated (1969), a Western with Rock Hudson; and Chisum (1970), a Western for Batjac and Warners.

McLaglen continued to specialise in Westerns. He did One More Train to Rob (1971) with George Peppard, under the director's contract with Universal, then Fools' Parade (1971) with James Stewart and George Kennedy, which McLaglen made for his own company through Columbia and said was his favourite film

He did Something Big starring Dean Martin; and Cahill U.S. Marshal (1973) with Wayne and Kennedy. "I don't really have any formula," he said in 1971. "I just use myself as a guide."

Return to television
McLaglen says "Then I had a little bit of a lapse" in his career. He returned to television doing episodes of Banacek with Peppard, Hec Ramsey with Richard Boone and Amy Prentiss. He made some TV movies The Log of the Black Pearl (1975) and Stowaway to the Moon (1975) then returned to features with Mitchell (1975) with Joe Don Baker, and The Last Hard Men (1976) with Charlton Heston and James Coburn.

McLaglen made some more TV movies, Banjo Hackett: Roamin' Free (1976), Royce (1976), Murder at the World Series (1977), and Trail of Danger (1978). He also directed episodes of Code R, The Fantastic Journey, and Nashville 99,

Adventure films
McLaglen was hired to make an adventure films, The Wild Geese (1978), with Richard Burton, Roger Moore and Richard Harris. McLaglen said the film " was a whole new start for my career". It was a huge success, and McLaglen then made Breakthrough (1979), a war film with Burton; North Sea Hijack (1979), an action film with Moore; The Sea Wolves (1980), a war movie from Euan Lloyd, the producer of The Wild Geese, with Moore and Gregory Peck.

McLaglen returned to television to make The Shadow Riders (1982) with Tom Selleck; The Blue and the Gray, an elaborate mini series about the Civil War; and Travis McGee (1983) starring Sam Elliott as Travis McGee, a pilot for a proposed series.

He directed Brooke Shields in Sahara (1983), then did two works for TV: The Dirty Dozen: Next Mission (1985) and On Wings of Eagles (1986).

His last feature films were Return from the River Kwai (1989) and Eye of the Widow (1991). McLaglen then retired and moved to San Juan Island, where he directed for the San Juan Island Community Theater.

Later years
McLaglen later moved to Friday Harbor, San Juan Island, Washington State, directing plays for San Juan Island Community Theater.

Personal life
McLaglen and his first wife, Margarita Harrison, had one child: Sharon McLaglen Lannan (born 1944).

He and his second wife, actress Veda Ann Borg were married in 1946 and separated in 1954, divorcing in 1957. They had one child: Andrew Victor McLaglen II (August 3, 1954 – January 16, 2006).

He and his third wife, Sally Pierce, had two children, Josh McLaglen, an assistant director, and Mary McLaglen, a production manager and producer.

Death
Andrew V. McLaglen died August 30, 2014, age 94, in Friday Harbor, Washington.

Films directed

 Gun the Man Down — Batjac film (1956)
 Man in the Vault — Batjac Film (1956)
 The Abductors (1957)
 Freckles (1960)
 The Little Shepherd of Kingdom Come (1961)
 McLintock! — With John Wayne (1963)
 Shenandoah With James Stewart (1965)
 The Rare Breed With James Stewart (1966)
 Monkeys, Go Home! (1967)
 The Way West (1967)
 The Ballad of Josie (1967)
 The Devil's Brigade (1968)
 Bandolero! With James Stewart (1968)
 Hellfighters — With John Wayne (1968)
 The Undefeated — With John Wayne (1969)
 Chisum — With John Wayne (1970)
 One More Train to Rob (1971)
 Fools' Parade With James Stewart (1971)
 Something Big (1971)
 Cahill U.S. Marshal — With John Wayne (1973)
 The Log of the Black Pearl — TV movie (1975)
 Stowaway to the Moon — TV movie (1975)
 Mitchell (1975)
 The Last Hard Men (1976)
 Banjo Hackett: Roamin’ Free - TV movie (1976)
 Royce — TV movie (1976)
 Murder at the World Series — TV movie (1977)
 Trail of Danger — TV movie (1978)
 The Wild Geese (1978)
 North Sea Hijack (1979)
 Breakthrough (1979)
 The Sea Wolves (1980)
 The Shadow Riders — TV movie (1982)
 Sahara (1983)
 Travis McGee (film) — TV movie (1983)
 The Dirty Dozen: Next Mission — TV movie (1985)
 On Wings of Eagles — TV miniseries (1986)
 Return from the River Kwai (1989)
 Eye of the Widow (1991)

Television directed

 Gunsmoke — 96 episodes (1956–1965)
 Have Gun – Will Travel — 116 episodes (1957–1963)
 Perry Mason — 7 episodes — (1958–1960)
 Rawhide — 6 episodes (1959–1962)
 Gunslinger — 5 episodes (1961)
 The Virginian — episode — Smile of a Dragon (1964)
 Wagon Train — episode — The Silver Lady (1965)
 The Wonderful World of Disney — 5 episodes (1970–1978)
 Banacek — episode — The Three Million Dollar Piracy (1973)
 Amy Prentiss — episode — The Desperate World of Jane Doe (1974)
 Hec Ramsey — episode — Scar Tissue (1974)
 Banacek — episode — Rocket to Oblivion (1974)
 The Blue and the Gray — episodes — Chapter One Parts 1–3 (1982)

Miscellaneous contributions

 Dakota — production assistant (uncredited) (1945)
 Bullfighter and the Lady — assistant director (1951)
 Big Jim McLain — assistant director (1952)
 The Quiet Man — 2nd Assistant Director (uncredited) (1952)
 Hondo — unit production manager (1953)
 Plunder of the Sun — assistant director (1953)
 This Is Your Life — episode — Victor McLaglen — himself (1953)
 Island in the Sky — assistant director (1953)
 Kansas Pacific — assistant director (1953)
 The High and the Mighty — assistant director (1954)
  Track of the Cat — assistant director (1954)
 Blood Alley — assistant director (1955)
 Seven Men From Now — Producer (1956)
 This Is Your Life — episode — Ken Curtis — himself (1972)
 The Hollywood Greats — episode — John Wayne — himself (1984)
 The Making of "The Quiet Man" — Video documentary short — himself (1992)
 The Quiet Man: The Joy of Ireland — Video Documentary Short — himself (2002)
 American Masters — episode — John Ford/John Wayne: The Filmmaker and the Legend — himself (2006)
 100 Years of John Wayne — TV Movie documentary short — himself (2007)

Further reading
 Armstrong, Stephen B. Andrew V. McLaglen: The Life and Hollywood Career. McFarland & Co. 2011. .

References

External links
 
 
 

1920 births
2014 deaths
American film directors
American television directors
British emigrants to the United States
English people of Scottish descent
English television directors
Film directors from London
German-language film directors
Western (genre) film directors
People from Friday Harbor, Washington